Kasper Kotkansalo (born 16 November 1998) is a Finnish professional ice hockey defenceman for HIFK of the Finnish Liiga. Kotkansalo played college hockey at Boston University. He was drafted 71st overall by the Detroit Red Wings in the 2017 NHL Entry Draft.

Playing career
On 13 October 2016, Kotkansalo committed to play college ice hockey for Boston University during the 2017–18 season. During the 2016–17 season, Kotkansalo recorded one goal and 11 assists in 47 games for the Sioux Falls Stampede of the United States Hockey League (USHL). After the 2019–20 season was abruptly cancelled due to the COVID-19 pandemic, Kotkansalo returned to his native Finland to be with his family. He finished his career with two goals and 23 assists in 112 games for the Terriers.

On 2 August 2020, Kotkansalo announced he would not return to Boston University for his senior season, citing uncertainties with the COVID-19 pandemic, and would stay in his native Finland to play hockey. On 3 August 2020, Kotkansalo signed a one-year contract with Ässät of the Finnish Liiga. He made his professional debut for Ässät on 2 October 2020. He scored his first career goal on 28 November 2020.

Career statistics

References

External links
 

1998 births
Living people
Ässät players
Boston University Terriers men's ice hockey players
Detroit Red Wings draft picks
Finnish ice hockey defencemen
HIFK (ice hockey) players
Sportspeople from Espoo
Finnish expatriate ice hockey players in the United States
Sioux Falls Stampede players